The Morro Bay kangaroo rat, Dipodomys heermanni morroensis, is endemic to San Luis Obispo County, California.

This subspecies of  “Heermann”  kangaroo rat today lives only in a restricted 2 km area south of Morro Bay in San Luis Obispo County, California. With 22 species, kangaroo rats can be found from the southeastern United States to Panama. They live in warm and semidesert areas, and like gerbils and pyramid rats resemble little kangaroos, with well-developed hind limbs for jumping, short front limbs, and a long tail used for balance  during the leap. Being nocturnal animals, their eyes are very large; their ears are average in size. Their hair on the back varies between brown and yellow, while the belly is white. The Morro Bay kangaroo rat is 11 to 13 cm long and its tail measures between 16 and 19 cm. It weighs between 60 and 80g.

Description
The Morro Bay kangaroo rat subspecies is unique to Baywood fine sands, a soil type found in Morro Bay, Los Osos, and Montana de Oro State Park on the Central Coast of California.  Their burrows enter the ground at an angle. The Morro Bay subspecies is the smallest of all subspecies. The male is measured to be 300.4 mm while the females are about 295.1 mm long.

Their primary food is seeds.

Dipodomys heermanni morroensis have 2 to 3 litters a year. In each litter they have between one and seven pups, but the average amount of pups per litter is two. They are born with no hair, eyes and ears closed, and toothless.

Endangered and missing
The Morro Bay kangaroo rat is federally endangered.

References 

Dipodomys
Endemic fauna of California
Morro Bay
Fauna of the California chaparral and woodlands
Natural history of San Luis Obispo County, California
Endangered fauna of California
ESA endangered species